Professor Francis P. B. Moto (born 1952) is a Malawian writer, academic, and diplomat. His home is Golomoti in the Dedza District of Malawi. He attended secondary school in Chichiri in Blantyre and was admitted to the University of Malawi in 1972, obtaining a degree in linguistics in 1977.

From 1978-1980 Francis Moto studied at the School of Oriental and African Studies (SOAS) in London, obtaining an MA in linguistics. He was awarded a PhD from University College London in 1989. From 1990-93, he served as Education Attaché of Malawi in London, Later he worked as lecturer in Chichewa and linguistics at Chancellor College (part of the University of Malawi). From 1998-2005 he was Principal of Chancellor College.

In 2005, following disturbances at the university, Francis Moto was removed as Principal by the then President of Malawi Bingu wa Mutharika. He was subsequently appointed High Commissioner of Malawi in London from 2005–10, and later served as the first Ambassador of Malawi in Brazil from 2011-15.

Francis Moto's book Trends in Malawi Literature (2001) has been the subject of a detailed critique by Professor Harri Englund of the University of Cambridge.

Publications
Five poems in the Chichewa language published in Enoch Mvula (ed.) Akoma Akagonera. Popular Publications, Limbe. (1981).
(with S. Mchombo) "Tone and the Theory of Syntax". Studies in African Linguistics, Supplement 8, 92-95. (1981).
"Aspects of tone assignment in Chichewa", Journal of Contemporary African Studies, 3: 1, 199-209 (1983).  
Nzeru Umati Zako Nzokuuza ("The wisdom you say is yours is what they tell you") Popular Publications, Limbe (1987), a collection of eleven short stories in the Chichewa language.
Phonology of the Bantu Lexicon. Doctoral Dissertation, University College London, (1989).
Gazing at the Setting Sun. Zomba: FEGS Publications International, (1994). (Poetry in English.)
"Burying political commentary in animal metaphor: a study of Malunga's Makangano a Nyama". Tizame, Issue No. 6, (1998), pp. 24-27.
"The tonal phonology of Bantu ideophones". Malilime: The Malawian Journal of Linguistics, (1999), no.1, 100-120.
"The semantics of poetic and dramatic works : the case of Mapanje and Chimombo". Paper to be presented at the.International Conference on Historical and Social Science Research in Malawi : Problems and Prospects. (2000)
Trends in Malawian Literature. Chancellor College Publishers. . (2001)
"Language and Societal Attitudes: A Study of Malawi's 'New Language'". Nordic Journal of African Studies 10(3): 320-343 (2001).
"Towards a Study of the Lexicon of Sex and HIV/AIDS" Nordic Journal of African Studies 13(3): 343–362 (2004)
The Context and Language of Jack Mapanje's Poetry. Centre for Advanced Studies of African Society. , (2008).
Language, Power and Society. Unisa Press.  (2009).

References

University of Malawi alumni
Alumni of SOAS University of London
Alumni of University College London
Academic staff of the University of Malawi
Short story writers
Malawian poets
Malawian diplomats
1952 births
Living people
Chewa-language writers